Sydney FC in an Australian soccer club that has participated in many international tournaments and friendlies from 2005 to the present season. Indeed, its first competitive fixture was to qualify for the Oceania Champions League. Despite their short history, Sydney FC have participated in four different international competitions, the most by any A-League club. They have competed at the Asian Champions League five times and at the Oceania Champions League (before the Football Federation Australia were admitted into the Asian Football Confederation). Sydney FC alongside Adelaide United and Western Sydney Wanderers are the only teams to have represented the A-League in the FIFA Club World Cup. Sydney FC are the only team to have represented the A-League in the Pan-Pacific Championship during the 2008 competition.

History

Oceania and Club World Cup (2005)

Sydney FC participated in the 2005 OFC Club Championship after defeating Queensland Roar, Perth Glory, and Central Coast Mariners in a qualifying tournament. The Championship was held in Papeete, Tahiti. Sydney's first match was against New Zealand team Auckland City FC, Sydney won 2–1. Sydney would go on to defeat AS Pirae and Sobou FC in the group stages to book a place in the Semi-final against Tafea FC. Sydney dispatched the side from Vanuatu 6–0 with Steve Corica scoring twice as a substitute. In the Final against AS Magenta, Sydney won 2–0 with goals coming from Matthew Bingley and David Zdrillic.

In December 2005, Sydney FC competed in the 2005 FIFA Club World Championship as the Oceania Football Confederation's entry to the tournament following their 2004–05 Oceania Club Championships success in June.
On 12 December, in front of a crowd of over 28,000 at Japan's Toyota Stadium, Sydney FC narrowly lost to Costa Rican champions Deportivo Saprissa 1–0, denying the club a semi–final match against European champion Liverpool F.C. Four days later, Sydney FC defeated the African "Club of the Century" Al Ahly 2–1 to finish the competition in fifth place.
This was to be any Australian football club's last year to qualify for the Club World Championship through the Oceania Club Championship. The FFA announced soon after Sydneys grand final win that Australia will depart from the Oceania Football Confederation to join the higher ranking Asian Football Confederation. The A-league now participates AFC's inter-city club tournaments such as the Asian Champions League held annually during the off-season of the A-league, and also the international cup tournaments such as the Asian Cup held every 4 years. Sydney FC went on to represent Australia in the Asian Champions league in 2007.

Match details

Move to Asia (2007–2011)

On 22 November 2006, Sydney FC and Adelaide United, as 2005–06 Champions and Premiers, were nominated as the first clubs to represent the Australia in the AFC Champions League 2007 to coincide with the FFA's inclusion into the AFC. Expectations were low for Sydney after a troubled season – many key players left the club at season's end and coach Terry Butcher was replaced by former NSL coach Branko Culina. Culina named a revamped 21-man squad and in their opening game on 7 March 2007 had 2–1 away win over Shanghai Shenhua with Ufuk Talay scoring a thunderous goal outside of the 18-yard box. That result was followed up with a 2–2 draw at home against Japanese club Urawa Red Diamonds after being up 2–0 in front of 21,010 – a larger home crowd than any of the previous season's regular matches. In a game delayed by a day after near monsoonal rain, they struggled away against Indonesian side Persik Kediri, losing 2–1 and showing their lack of match fitness against a better than expected Persik side.

In the return match a fortnight later, Sydney FC revenged the loss at Parramatta Stadium in western Sydney, defeating Persik 3–0 with goals from Steve Corica and Alex Brosque. Sydney's final matches in the group finished in stalemates, first at home to Shanghai and then in Japan at Urawa Reds. Sydney was one point behind Urawa in their group ladder going into the final match, faced with needing to win in order to progress. Unable to capitalise on good ball possession, the match ended 0–0 and thus ended Sydney's Asian Champions League campaign as only the first-placed team progressed to the knockout phase of the competition.

The following season, Sydney FC was selected to represent Australia and the AFC in the Pan-Pacific Championship after being the highest placed A-League club in the 2007–08 A-League season not competing in the conclusion of that competition's finals series. On 20 February, Sydney were pitted against Houston Dynamo, who had won the previous season's MLS Championship. The match was played on artificial turf at Aloha Stadium. Sydney were never really settled in the unfamiliar conditions, and suffered a 3–0 loss. Sydney newcomer Ryan Walsh was dispossessed of the ball 8 metres from the 18-yard box by Brian Ching, and the Canadian International Dwayne De Rosario put the ball past keeper Clint Bolton. Then, straight after the restart by Sydney, Stuart Holden received a 'through-ball' pass from Dwayne De Rosario, and shot past a stunned Sydney defence from the edge of the 6-yard box. When Chris Wondolowski scored before half-time to make the score 3–0, Sydney FC had really lost hope of coming back.

An under-strength Sydney went into the 3/4 playoff against Los Angeles Galaxy fairly confident, as they had already beaten them during the November 2007 friendly match. However, Sydney fell behind only 3 minutes into the match when multimillion-dollar English signing David Beckham sent in a pin-point cross from the right wing to find striker Ely Allen, who volleyed the ball past Sydney keeper Ivan Necevski. Defender Brendan Renaud then scored with a powerful shot from 30 metres out in the top right corner, but the Los Angeles team regained the lead soon after, as David Beckham again sent in a cross that Necevski couldn't handle and palmed to the feet of Los Angeles midfielder Josh Tudela, who tapped the ball into the net. LA went on to win the match 2–1, and Sydney finished 4th in the inaugural tournament. Japanese side Gamba Osaka finished 1st, after a 6–1 thrashing of MLS Champions Houston Dynamo.

Despite a poor 2010–11 season and following several key players being released to other clubs, Sydney were expected to do well during the 2011 Asian Champions League campaign. Unfortunately, Sydney struggled against the superior East-Asian teams, however managed to gain 2 points from their opening 2 rounds against Kashima Antlers and Shanghai Shenhua.

The home leg against Shanghai was a frustrating match where Sydney missed several easy chances and being forced to settle for a 1–1 draw. In Sydney's final home match against Korean team Suwon Samsung Bluewings, Sydney were belted 3–0 by a dominant Bluewings outfit. However, the team regained some faith with a twice come-from-behind win against Shanghai Shenhua in Shanghai, China winning 3–2 with Brazilian striker Bruno Cazarine helping with a brace.

Sydney would go on to finish 3rd in the group stage after losing away to Kashima 2–1 in Tokyo. Sydney were unable to qualify for the Round of 16, winning 1 game, drawing 2 and losing 3.

Match details

Return to Asia (2016–present)

After many lean seasons domestically, Sydney qualified to compete in the AFC Champions League for the first time after a four-year hiatus when they came second in the 2014–15 A-League season. Despite a poor 2015–16 season and following several key players being released to other clubs, Sydney were expected to do well during the 2016 Asian Champions League. They were placed in group of "death" stage. However, one of the surprising results was that they were able to defeat defending champions Guangzhou Evergrande 2–1 in a home leg at Allianz Stadium. Sydney would go on to finish 1st out of 4 teams：winning 3 games, drawing 1 and losing 2. This meant Sydney progressed to the knockout stages for the first time in the Champions League.

After a strong result away in the first leg, drawing 1–1 with Chinese side Shandong Luneng it seemed that Sydney might progress to the Quarter-finals. Leading 2–1 at home in the second leg, Hao Junmin scored a 90th-minute equaliser to draw Shandong level 3–3 on aggregate. This effectively finished the Sky Blues continental hopes as Shandong progressed to the next stage on away goals.

Despite a strong 2017–18 season, Sydney were expected to do well during the 2018 Asian Champions League. Ironically, they were placed in the same group as they did in 2011 campaign. Despite Sydney FC beating Suwon Bluewings away from home and having not scoring a goal at home, they finished their disappointing 2018 campaign in 3rd place, unable to progress to the knockout stage for the second time.

Sydney qualified for the AFC Champions League for a second consecutive year and the third time in four years when they competed in the 2019 AFC Champions League. However, they were pitted against very strong opposition in 2018 Chinese Super League champions Shanghai SIPG, 2018 J1 League Champions Kawasaki Frontale and Korean qualifiers Ulsan Hyundai. It was the first time that Sydney had met any of these teams in the Champions League. Shanghai SIPG were considered particularly strong, boasting world-class players like Oscar, Hulk, Elkeson and Odil Akhmedov for the tournament.

In Sydney's first match, they were scheduled to host Ulsan at Jubilee Stadium. In a very windy match, Sydney asserted early dominance with striker Adam Le Fondre creating three good chances in the opening 12 minutes. As the wind continued to pick-up in the second half Sydney continued to control ball possession but could not find the goal to break the stalemate despite repeated incursions into the Korean final third. The score ended 0–0.

Sydney traveled to Japan for their second game against Kawasaki. The hosts had the better of possession and opportunities in both halves, however Sydney defended well for large periods of the game. Sydney's goalkeeper Andrew Redmayne made some fine saves to keep his team in the contest. It took until the 83-minute for Manabu Saito to give Kawasaki the lead in front of an 11,000 strong crowd. The match ended 1–0, handing Sydney FC their first defeat for the campaign as Kawasaki picked up their first points for the tournament.

Sydney returned home for their third game of the campaign among a busy schedule for the side in their domestic league, playing the match in between a Big Blue and a Sydney derby against their two fiercest rivals. The Big Blue in particular had significant importance as the winner would most likely finish in the all-important second place for the end of season standings. Despite this, Sydney largely put out a full-strength team as Johnny Warren Medalist Milos Ninkovic the main notable exception in the starting squad. Billed as a David and Goliath battle against Shanghai SIPG, the Sydney community were encouraged to attend the game to watch the likes of Oscar, Hulk and Elkeson in their own city. To the surprise of many, Sydney took an early lead with loan marquee Siem de Jong scoring in the third minute. A cushioned header from Lu Wenjun for Shanghai drew the scores level before Le Fondre took back the lead for Sydney, converting a penalty for a hand-ball in the box by a Shanghai defender. Yu Hai once again brought the scores level nodding home a cross from Hulk. Sydney continued to search for a go-ahead goal throughout much of the second half controlling much of the possession in Shanghai's half. Alex Brosque finally broke the deadlock in the 84th minute, one minute after being substituted into the game. Shanghai once again denied Sydney from taking the three points when Elkeson blasted home the equaliser in the 89th minute capitalising on a swift counter-attack after Josh Brillante lost possession for Sydney in midfield. The cruel end to the game left Sydney in last place of the group standings at the mid-way point of the Group Stage on 2 points, having already played two of three home games. Sydney failed to win in any of their three remaining games only picking up 1 point, leaving them at the bottom of the group standings.

Match details

Records

 Most appearances in Asian competition: 22, Rhyan Grant
 Most goals in Asian competition: 5, Trent Buhagiar
 Most goals in Asian tournament: 5, Trent Buhagiar in 2020 AFC Champions League campaign.
 First Asian match: Shanghai Shenhua 1–2 Sydney FC, AFC Champions League, Group Stage, 7 March 2007
 First goal scored in Asia: Steve Corica, against Shanghai Shenhua
 Biggest win: 4 goals, 4–0 against Shanghai SIPG, 1 December 2020 at Al Janoub Stadium.
 Biggest defeat: 4 goals, 0–4 against Kawasaki Frontale, 21 May 2019 at Jubilee Oval and 0–4 against Yokohama F. Marinos, 19 February 2020 at Nissan Stadium.
 Highest Asian home attendance: 21,010 against Urawa Red Diamonds in the 2007 AFC Champions League, 21 March 2007.
 Lowest Asian home attendance: 3,813 against Kawasaki Frontale in the 2019 AFC Champions League, 21 May 2019.

By season
Key 
 Runners-Up in Final 
 Winners in Final

By competition

By country

By club
Competitive matches only. These include OFC Club Championship, AFC Champions League, FIFA Club World Championship and Pan-Pacific Championship.

By league (home and away record in AFC Champions League)
Where games were played at a neutral venue, no statistics are displayed for home and away fixtures as a result. This was the case for the four out of six rescheduled group stage games in the 2020 AFC Champions League and all six group stage games played in the 2022 AFC Champions League.

 Against Chinese clubs

 Against Filipino clubs

 Against Indonesian clubs

 Against Japanese clubs

 Against South Korean clubs

Notes
Does NOT include 2020 and 2022 AFC Champions League group stage matches that were played on neutral grounds. They were two games against Shanghai SIPG (China), two against Hoàng Anh Gia Lai (Vietnam) and three against Jeonbuk Hyundai (South Korea) and Yokohama F. Marinos (Japan)

Goalscorers

 Key
 ACL = AFC Champions League
 OFC = OFC Champions League
 CWC = FIFA Club World Cup
 PPC = Pan-Pacific Championship

 Players in bold are still playing for the club

Friendlies
During the 2007–08 season Sydney FC hosted the LA Galaxy in an exhibition game at ANZ Stadium, Sydney. The match was of important significance in Australia as it brought the legend of the game, David Beckham, to its shores. He did not fail to disappoint, scoring a stunning trademark free kick. Sydney FC won the game 5–3, in front of a record crowd for a Sydney FC match of 80,295.

Sydney had a friendly match in China, with new sister club Shanghai Shenhua. Sydney FC lost the match 2–1, with their goal coming from striker Alex Brosque, who scored halfway through the second half to level the scores at 1–1. John Aloisi, who had a poor last season, showed he had hit form, but being very unlucky to have two goals disallowed during the first half. It was the first game for former Sydney and Socceroos Tony Popovic as caretaker coach.

July 2010 marked a boom for international friendlies with Everton F.C. making an appearance on Sydney shores for a one-off game against Sydney FC. Everton won the match 1–0 courtesy of a Victor Anichebe second half strike. However, that wouldn't be the end of international friendlies for the region as a blockbuster event with three more European teams arriving for the 2010 Sydney Festival of Football. The festival was an international friendly tournament held during the 2010–11 A-League pre-season in Sydney. The teams invited to the tournament included Socceroo Brett Emerton's Blackburn Rovers, Nathan Burns' AEK Athens and Craig Moore's ex-club Rangers F.C. All matches were played at the Sydney Football Stadium. The tournament did not follow a traditional structure as points were also awarded for goals scored during the tournament. Each team played each other once over three matchdays. Sydney FC were placed last at the conclusion of the tournament after failing to win any games and scoring four goals (three of which were by Alex Brosque).

Sydney FC did not participate in any international friendlies again until the 2013–14 season when the club decided to tour to club captain, Alessandro Del Piero's native Italy, playing six sides in the northern part of the country. The results were varied, Sydney finished the tour with three wins, one draw and two losses. Sydney also made a pit-stop in Japan on-route to Italy playing against Sagan Tosu in July, losing 2–1.

The 2014–15 pre-season again saw Sydney FC participating in a friendly tournament, this time in New Zealand. The tour was called the Football United Tour and games were held in Dunedin, Auckland and Wellington over three days. Newcastle United F.C. and West Ham United F.C. were invited to represent the English Premier League and Sydney FC and Wellington Phoenix were the A-League representatives. However they did not play against each other in the tournament. Instead, they each played an English team during the week (in Dunedin or Auckland) and played the other English team in a double-header on the Saturday in Wellington.

The post-season saw even more English world-class clubs arrive in Australia, with London clubs Tottenham Hotspurs F.C. and Chelsea F.C. participating in exhibition matches in May and June 2015. Sydney lost both matches by a scoreline of 0–1 despite being very competitive.

After a two-year hiatus, world-renowned English clubs again returned to Australia in May and July 2017. Sydney first played Liverpool F.C., losing 0–3, then Arsenal F.C., losing 0–2.

The notion of football friendly tournaments returned in 2022 and saw the Sydney Super Cup being held for the first time. Celtic were originally due to be joined by rivals Rangers in a four-team three-match tournament, however Everton eventually took Rangers place in the tournament after they withdrew from the tournament on 21 March 2022. The only match Sydney participated in was against Celtic, winning the match 2–1.

Match details

Statistics by club

References

External links

Sydney FC